Be My Lover may refer to:

"Be My Lover" (La Bouche song)
"Be My Lover" (Inna song)
"Be My Lover", a song by Alice Cooper from the album Killer
Be My Lover (La Toya Jackson album)
Be My Lover (O'Bryan album)